The Argentine Academy of Cinematography Arts and Sciences was an industry association in Argentina founded in 1941. It was closed by the military junta in 1955.

Foundation

The First Film Museum of Argentina encouraged the foundation of the original Argentine Academy of Cinematography Arts and Sciences.
Manuel Peña Rodriguez and Chas de Cruz, members of the museum outlined an approach based on the organization and experience of the similar Academy of Motion Picture Arts and Sciences in Hollywood.
The basic idea was to organize members of each specialty into associations that would form the different branches of the Academy. They would then nominate delegates to meet and establish the academy. The task proved difficult, since only producers, exhibitors and actors had associations. Peña and Chas had to meet with directors, cinematographers, sound engineers, musicians and so on and persuade them to organize. Eventually the delegates met on 22 November 1941 at the headquarters of the First Film Museum and agreed to establish the academy.

History

The first officers included the director and actor Mario Soffici as president, and the journalist and writer Chas de Cruz and businessman Carlos Connio Santini as secretaries.
The Academy was born a year before the Film Critics Association (Asociación de Cronistas Cinematográficos), but began to present awards for local productions a year later, in 1943. The film selected for the Cóndor prize for production that year was Juvenilia by Augusto César Vatteone, while the prize for director went to Soffici for Tres hombres del río.

Over the years, and during the peak of Peronism, the academy became increasingly politicized. However, until 1949 the academy agreed with the main entry of the critics, and again agreed with the critics in 1951 and 1952. Throughout the first period the academy was accused of being a political lobby whose members was favored by the state in getting credit and unexposed film, which was scarce. The last set of Academy Awards was presented for 1954, shortly before the 1955 coup that ousted the Peronists. Some of the academy members had to leave the country, such as Luis César Amadori, author of classics such as Dios se lo pague (God will pay) and Nacha Regules.

Awards
The awards given by the academy for films made in 1941-54 were as follows:

References
Notes

Citations

Sources

Film-related professional associations
Film organisations in Argentina
1941 establishments in Argentina
1955 disestablishments in Argentina
Arts organizations established in 1941
Organizations disestablished in 1955